Myriocephalus pluriflorus  is a plant in the family Asteraceae, native to Western Australia, South Australia and New South Wales.

It was first described by John McConnell Black in 1929 as Myriocephalus rhizocephalus var. pluriflorus. It was raised to species status in 1986 by David Alan Cooke.

References

External links 
 Myriocephalus pluriflorus occurrence data from the Australasian Virtual Herbarium

Gnaphalieae
Flora of South Australia
Flora of New South Wales
Flora of Western Australia
Plants described in 1929